Lisu (Fraser alphabet: ,  or ;; ;) is a tonal Tibeto-Burman language spoken in Yunnan (Southwestern China), Northern Burma (Myanmar) and Thailand and a small part of India. Along with Lipo, it is one of two languages of the Lisu people. Lisu has many dialects that originate from the country in which they live. Hua Lisu, Pai Lisu and Lu Shi Lisu dialects are spoken in China. Although they are mutually intelligible, some have many more loan words from other languages than others.

The Lisu language is closely related to the Lahu and Akha languages and is also related to Burmese, Jingphaw and Yi languages.

Demographics
In China, the Lisu people are mostly found in Yunnan, the majority living mainly in Nujiang and Weixi, but also in Baoshan, Dehong, Lincang, Chuxionj, Luquan and Dali. In Sichuan, where they make a small minority, they also speak Lipo, and they are sometimes classified under the Yi nationality. A number of Lisu can also be found in southern Tibet.

In Myanmar, it is spoken in Shan State, Kachin State, Sagaing Division and Mandalay Division. The two states are bordered by Yunnan. The Fraser script was invented in Myanmar by Sara Ba Thaw.

In India, it is spoken in the Changlang District of Arunachal Pradesh and possibly in the Tinsukia District of Assam. See Lisu people#Lisu in India for more information. Lisu people in India are called Yobin.

In Northern Thailand, it is spoken mainly in the provinces of Chiang Mai, Chiang Rai, Mae Hong Son and Kamphing Phat.

Possibly, there are also perhaps some Lisu speakers in the Phongsaly Province of Laos and in the Lai Chau Province of Vietnam.

Dialects
Three dialects can be distinguished: northern, central and southern, with northern being the standard.

Bradley (2003)
Bradley (2003) lists the following three Lisu dialects.

Northern ('Black Lisu' (autonym), 'Northern Lisu' (name given by other Lisu)): Northwest Yunnan, Kachin State and India
Central (Flowery Lisu or Hua Lisu): Western Yunnan, Burma
Southern ('Yellow Lisu'): extreme Southwestern Yunnan, Shan State of Burma, Thailand, Laos, Vietnam

Mu and Sun (2012)
In their study of Lisu dialects, Mu and Sun (2012) split Lisu into three dialects.
Nujiang 怒江方言: 550,000 speakers in Nujiang Prefecture (all counties), Baoshan Prefecture (all counties), Dehong Prefecture (some counties), Lincang Prefecture (some counties), Dali Prefecture (a few counties) and Weixi County
Luquan 禄劝方言: 65,000 speakers in parts of Chuxiong Prefecture (in Luquan County, Wuding County, etc.) and parts of neighboring prefectures
Yongsheng 永胜方言: 18,000 speakers in the counties of Yongsheng, Huaping, Panzhihua, Muli, Yanyuan and others

Mu and Sun (2012) compare a total of five datapoints in their comparative vocabulary table.
Fugong 福贡: 140,000 speakers in Fugong, Gongshan, Lanping, etc.
Luquan 禄劝 (autonym: , Lipo): 45,000+ speakers in Binchuan, Wuding, Yuanmou, Dayao, Yao'an, Yongren, Dechang, Huili, Huidong, Yanyuan, etc.
Weixi 维西: 100,000+ speakers in Weixi, Deqin, Zhongdian, Lijiang, etc.
Tengchong 腾冲: 120,000+ speakers in Longling, Dehong Prefecture, Gengma, Simao, Lushui, Shan State (Burma), Chiang Mai (Thailand)
Yongsheng 永胜: 90,000+ speakers in Yongsheng, Huaping, Ninglang, Dayao, Yongren, Dechang, etc.

Orthography

Pollard alphabet

Sam Pollard's A-Hmao was adapted to write Lipo, another Lisoish language (sometimes called Eastern Lisu) spoken by the Lisu people.

Fraser alphabet

The Lisu alphabet currently in use throughout Lisu-speaking regions in China, Burma and Thailand was primarily developed by two Protestant missionaries from different missionary organizations. The more famous of the two is James O. Fraser, a British evangelist from the China Inland Mission. His colleague, who developed the original version of the alphabet (later revised and improved with Fraser and various colleagues from the C.I.M.) was Sara Ba Thaw, a polyglot Karen preacher based in Myitkyina, Burma, who belonged to the American Baptist Mission.

Ba Thaw had prepared a simple Lisu catechism by 1915. The script now widely known as the "Fraser alphabet" was finished by 1939, when Fraser's mission houses in the Lisu ethnic areas of Yunnan Province (China) received their newly printed copies of the Lisu New Testament.

Lisu syllabary

From 1924 to 1930, a Lisu farmer called Ngua-ze-bo (pronounced) invented the Lisu syllabary from Chinese script, Dongba script and Geba script. However, it looks more different from the Chinese script than Chữ Nôm and Sawndip (Zhuang logograms). Since Ngua-ze-bo initially carved his characters on bamboos, the syllabary is known as the Lisu Bamboo script (傈僳竹书).

It has a total of 1250 glyphs and 880 characters.

Latin Lisu alphabet
A new Lisu alphabet based on pinyin was created in 1957, but most Lisu continued to use the old alphabet. The Fraser alphabet was officially recognized by the Chinese government in 1992, since which time its use has been encouraged.

Burmese Lisu script
In a few places in Myanmar in which Lisu is spoken, an orthography based on the Burmese alphabet has been developed and is taught to speakers and used in several publications and school books.

Phonology
The Lisu phonological inventory is as follows.

Vowels

The distinction originates from proto-Lolo–Burmese consonant clusters of the type *kr or *kj, which elsewhere merge, but where Lisu normally develops , they remain distinct with the latter producing the type , the former the type . Inherited palatal affricates +  also become .

 is variable across dialects.

Tones
Lisu has six tones: high , mid creaky , mid , low , rising  and low checked  (that is). In some dialects the creaky tone is higher than mid tone, in others they are equal. The rising tone is infrequent, but common in baby talk (which has a stereotypical disyllabic low–rising pattern); both high and rising tone are uncommon after voiced consonants.

Consonants

The subdialect Fraser first encountered also distinguishes a retroflex series, but only before .

Medial glides appear before .

In Southern Lisu, the velar plosives become alveopalatal before front vowels. The vowels  and  trigger an offglide on preceding consonants, so  are pronounced .

The vowels  do not occur initially—or, at least, in initial position they are pronounced . It has been argued that the initial vowels  are phonetically , so initial consonants do not need to be posited in such cases (and marginal  can be removed from the inventory of native words), or that they are phonemically , with glottal stop.

References

Works cited

Further reading

 Miyake, Marc. 2011. Unicode 5.2 (not 6.1!): the Old Lisu script.

External links

 Handbook of the Lisu language (1922)

Loloish languages
Languages of China
Languages of India
Languages of Myanmar
Languages of Thailand